The 1996 Asian Taekwondo Championships are the 12th edition of the Asian Taekwondo Championships, and were held in Melbourne, Australia from 14 June to 16 June, 1996.

Medal summary

Men

Women

Medal table

References
 Results

External links
WT Official Website

Asian Championships
Asian Taekwondo Championships
Asian Taekwondo Championships
Taekwondo Championships
Taekwondo in Australia